Joseph Sullivan may refer to:

* Joseph Sullivan (cricketer) (1890–1932), Yorkshire cricketer
 Joseph Sullivan (FBI agent) (1917–2002), FBI major case investigator who led the investigation of the murders of three civil rights workers in 1964
 Joseph Sullivan (mayor) (born 1959), mayor of Braintree, Massachusetts
 Joseph Sullivan (British politician) (1866–1935), Scottish Member of Parliament for North Lanarkshire and Bothwell
 Joseph Sullivan (rower) (born 1987), New Zealand rower
 Joseph Sullivan (diplomat), American ambassador
 Joseph A. Sullivan (1911–2002), Pennsylvania politician
 Joseph Albert Sullivan (1901–1988), Canadian ice hockey player
 Joseph Eugene Sullivan (1918–1942), American sailor, one of the five Sullivan brothers killed in World War II
 Joseph J. Sullivan (1870–1949), professional gambler and instigator of the 1919 Black Sox scandal
 Joseph J. Sullivan (vaudeville), blackface comedian and acrobat in New York
 Joseph Michael Sullivan (1930–2013), American prelate of the Roman Catholic Church
 Joseph Vincent Sullivan (1919–1982), American prelate of the Roman Catholic Church
 Joseph Sullivan (Heroes), a fictional character in the TV series Heroes

See also
 Joe Sullivan (disambiguation)